Ravi Kumar Menon is an Indian film and television actor in Malayalam and Tamil movies and serials. He has acted more than 100 south Indian films. 
He played lead roles during the 1970s. His came to Malayalam film industry through his debut movie Ullasa Yaathra (1975).

Background
Ravi Kumar  was born in Trichur, Kerala. His debut movie as a hero was Ullasa Yaathra (1975). After that he had acted a lot of movies in Malayalam and Tamil as hero.

Filmography

Malayalam

 Lakshaprabhu (1968)
 Ullaasayaathra (1975)
 Neelasaari (1976)
 Romeo (1976)
 Ayalkkaari (1976) as Mohanan
 Amma (1976)
 Aashirvadham (1977)
 Sreemurukan (1977)
 Innale Innu (1977)
 Yatheem (1977) as Siddhique
 Aanandam Paramaanandam (1977)
 Abhinivesham (1977) as Babu
 Aa Nimisham (1977)
 Madhuraswapnam (1977)
 Pattalaam Jaanaki (1977)
 Angeekaaram (1977) as Prasad
 Samudram (1977) as Mohan
 Thacholi Ambu (1978)
 Ninakku Njaanum Enikku Neeyum (1978)
 Aanayum Ambaariyum (1978)
 Adavukal Pathinettu (1978)
 Madhurikkunna Raathri (1978)
 Etho Oru Swapnam (1978)
 Avalude Ravukal (1978) as Babu
 Padakkuthira (1978)
 Lisa (1978)
 Amarsham (1978)
 Ee Manoharatheeram (1978) as Venugopal
 Aalmaaraattam (1978)
 Aval Kanda Lokam (1978)
 Tiger Salim (1978)
 Black Belt (1978)
 Thiranottam (1978)
 Ajnaatha Theerangal (1979)
 Ottapettavar (1979)
 Neelathamara (1979 film)
 Koumaarapraayam (1979)
 Jimmy (1979) as  Antony
 Allauddinum Albhutha Vilakkum (1979)
 Anupallavi (1979)
 Pushyaraagam (1979)
 Ezham Kadalinakkare (1979) as Chandran
 Sarppam (1979)
 Puzha (1980)
 Sakthi (1980)
 Thirayum Theeravum (1980)
 Sishirathil Oru Vasantham (1980)
 Angadi (1980)
 Ivar (1980)
 Rajaneegandhi (1980)
 Hridayam Paadunu (1980)
 Chora Chuvanna Chora (1980)
 Theenaalangal (1980) as Babu
 Theekkadal (1980) as  Dr Prasannan
 Swathu (1980)
 Ammayum Makalum (1980)
 Prakadanam (1980) as Devan
 Kaanthavalayam (1980) as Shyam
 Ashwaradham (1980)
 Aagamanam (1980)
 Saahasam (1981)
 Nizhal Yudham (1981)
 Choothaattam (1981)
 Orikkalkkoodi (1981)
 Sphodanam (1981)
 Veliyettam (1981) as Ravi
 Ankachamayam (1982)
 Rakthasaakshi (1982)
 Madrasile Mon (1982)
 Maattuvin Chattangale (1982) as Jayan
 Drohi (1982)
 Jambulingam (1982)
 Karthavyam (1982) as Krishnakumar
 Chilanthivala (1982)
 Kodumkattu (1983)
 Thavalam (1983) as Mohan
 Umanilayam (1984)
 Surabhi Yamangal (1984)
 Ajantha (1987)
 Kallanum Policum (1992)
 Sainyam (1994)
 Nishasurabhikal (2000)
 Agrahaaram (2001)
Aarattu (2021)
CBI 5: The Brain (2022)

Tamil

Swati Natchathiram (1974)
Avargal (1977)
Allauddinum Albhutha Vilakkum (1979)
Pagalil Oru Iravu (1979)
Anandha Ragam (1982)
Kannodu Kan (1983)
Malabar Police (1999)
Ponnu Veetukkaran (1999)
Rojavanam (1999)
Vanna Thamizh Pattu (2000)
Youth (2002)
Maaran (2002)
Ramanaa (2002)
Lesa Lesa (2003)
June R (2006)
Sivaji (2007)
Veetla Vishesham (2022)

Television

References

External links
 

Living people
20th-century Indian male actors
21st-century Indian male actors
Indian male film actors
Indian male television actors
Male actors from Kerala
People from Thalassery
Year of birth missing (living people)